The Billboard Vietnam Hot 100 is a record chart in Vietnam for songs, compiled by Billboard Việt Nam since January 2022. The chart is updated every Thursday (ICT) on both the Billboard Việt Nam and Billboard websites.

The first number-one song on the chart was "" by  featuring  on the issue dated January 14, 2022.

Methodology
The chart tracks songs' performance from Friday to Thursday. Chart rankings are based on digital downloads from full-service digital music retailers (sales from direct-to-consumer sites such as an individual artist's store are excluded) and online streaming occurred in Vietnam during the tracking period. All data are provided by MRC Data.

Billboard Vietnam Top Vietnamese Songs
Billboard Vietnam has a separate chart called Top Vietnamese Songs. The chart utilizes the same methodology as the Vietnam Hot 100 chart, but only tracks Vietnamese-language songs.

List of number-one songs

2022

2023

Song milestones

Most weeks at number one

Most weeks at number one on the Top Vietnamese Songs

Artist achievements

Most number-one singles

Most weeks at number one

Most number-one singles on the Top Vietnamese Songs

Most weeks at number one on the Top Vietnamese Songs

Notes

References

Vietnam Hot 100
Vietnamese music